The 7th Regiment Indiana Volunteer Infantry was an infantry regiment from the State of Indiana that served in the Union Army during the American Civil War.

Service
The 7th Indiana Volunteer Infantry was organized at Indianapolis, Indiana, between April 21 and April 27, 1861.  The Regiment was sent to Grafton, Virginia (now West Virginia) on May 30, 1861, and participated in the Battle of Philippi, one of the first land battles of the Civil War, on June 3, 1861.

As part of Brigadier General Thomas A. Morris' Indiana Brigade (of Major General George B. McClellan's Army of West Virginia), the 7th Indiana participated in the Rich Mountain Campaign from July 6 to 17. The regiment saw action at Laurel Hill (July 7), Belington (July 8), the Battle of Corrick's Ford (July 12–14), and in the pursuit of Brig. Gen. Robert S. Garnett's forces (July 15–17). The regiment was mustered out of service on August 2, 1861.

A new 7th Indiana was organized from the three-month regiment at Indianapolis, Indiana, on September 13, 1861. The regiment mustered out of service on September 20, 1864.  Men who re-enlisted, and those still with unexpired service, were transferred to the 19th Indiana Volunteer Infantry Regiment.

Total strength and casualties
The three-month regiment suffered one enlisted man killed in battle and two enlisted men who died of disease, for a total of three fatalities.

The re-mustered regiment suffered 8 officers and 108 enlisted men killed in action or died of wounds and 2 officers and 111 enlisted men who died of disease, for a total of 229 fatalities.

Commanders
 Colonel Ebenezer Dumont
 Colonel Ira G. Grover

See also

 List of Indiana Civil War regiments
 Indiana in the Civil War

Notes

References
Union Regimental Histories - Indiana, The Civil War Archive website, after Dyer, Frederick Henry. A Compendium of the War of the Rebellion. 3 vols. New York: Thomas Yoseloff, 1959.
Civil War - Indiana

Military units and formations established in 1861
Military units and formations disestablished in 1861
Military units and formations disestablished in 1864
1864 disestablishments in the United States
Units and formations of the Union Army from Indiana
1861 establishments in Indiana
1864 disestablishments in Indiana